Sir Peter Kenilorea KBE  (22 May 1944 – 24 February 2016) was a Solomon Islander politician, officially styled The Rt Hon. Sir Peter Kenilorea as a member of the Privy Council of the United Kingdom. He was the first Prime Minister of an independent Solomon Islands, from 1978–1981, and also served a second term from 1984–1986.

Biography
Kenilorea was born in Takataka village on Malaita island, of ꞌAreꞌare ethnicity. He was trained as a teacher for the South Seas Evangelical Church and a co-founder of the Solomon Islands Christian Association. As a young man he helped to found the Solomon Islands United Party.

In the 1973 general elections he ran in the ꞌAreꞌare constituency, losing to David Kausimae. By the time of the 1976 elections the constituency was split and Kenilorea was elected to Parliament in the East ꞌAreꞌare constituency. He became Chief Minister of the Solomon Islands in the same year and led the country to independence from Britain in 1978. He then served as the first Prime Minister of the Solomon Islands until 1981, and again from 1984 to 1986. He served as Minister of Foreign Affairs from 1988 to 1989 and from 1990 to 1993.

Following fighting between the Malaita Eagle Force and the Isatabu Freedom Movement, Kenilorea was, along with Paul Tovua, co-chairman of the peace talks, and he became Chairman of the eight-member Peace Monitoring Council, which was created in August 2000. In the Seventh Parliament, which sat from 2001 to 2005, he was Speaker of Parliament.

He was a candidate for the post of Governor-General in mid-June 2004, but he received only 8 of 41 votes in Parliament, placing second behind Nathaniel Waena, who received 27 votes. Following the 2006 general election, he was re-elected as Speaker of Parliament without opposition in April 2006. He held the position until 2010.

He subsequently sought to return to Parliament, and was an unsuccessful candidate in a by-election in East ꞌAreꞌare in August 2012. He died on 24 February 2016 of natural causes. Kenilorea's son Peter Kenilorea Jr. was elected a member of parliament in April 2019.

References

External links
Sir Peter's detailed biography and chronology on the website of the Solomon Star newspaper
"Realising political stability". Transcript of Sir Peter Kenilorea's opening address at a conference on "Political Parties and Integrity Reform",  Honiara, August 30, 2008

 

1944 births
2016 deaths
Prime Ministers of the Solomon Islands
Leaders of the Opposition (Solomon Islands)
People from Malaita Province
Speakers of the National Parliament of the Solomon Islands
Members of the National Parliament of the Solomon Islands
Knights Commander of the Order of the British Empire
Members of the Privy Council of the United Kingdom